Eberhard Mahle (7 January 1933 – 21 December 2021) was a German racing driver.

Life and career
Mahle was born into a family of automobile assembly line workers, including his father, industrialist . In 1959, he finished second in the Targa Florio in a Porsche 550. In 1966, he won the European Hill Climb Championship in the Sports Car category in a Porsche 911. After his retirement in 1968, he lived in Leonberg and devoted himself to the family business, Mahle GmbH.

He died on 21 December 2021, at the age of 88.

Awards
Silbernes Lorbeerblatt (1967)

References

1933 births
2021 deaths
Businesspeople from Stuttgart
German racing drivers